The Western Armenia national football team is a football team representing the Armenians primarily from the historical region of Western Armenia, which is currently within the borders of Turkey.

History
The governing body, the Football Federation of Western Armenia, was formed in 2015 and joined the Confederation of Independent Football Associations (ConIFA) on 1 June of that year. The team's first ever game was played on 6 January 2016, when a Western Armenia XI played against Olympique de Marseille (CFA), the reserve team of the leading French football club. Vahagn Militosyan scored both goals in a 3–2 defeat.

10 days after the team's first ever game, Western Armenia was selected at ConIFA's 3rd AGM to be one of the 12 participants in the 2016 ConIFA World Football Cup, to be held in Abkhazia in May and June. In the draw for the competition, the team was selected in Group A alongside the hosts and the Chagos Islands. Western Armenia's first full international, against the Chagos Islands, ended with the team inflicting a record 12–0 defeat on the Chagossians, before going down to a 1–0 defeat against Abkhazia in the final group game. This though was enough for the team to qualify for the quarter-finals where they played the Panjab football team.

International matches

Current squad
The following players were called up for the 2018 ConIFA World Football Cup.

Managers

President

References

Western Armenia
CONIFA member associations
European national and official selection-teams not affiliated to FIFA